This list comprises all players who have participated in at least one league match for Vancouver Whitecaps since the USL began keeping archived records in 2003. Players who were on the roster but never played a first team game are not listed; players who appeared for the team in other competitions (Voyageurs Cup, Open Canada Cup, CONCACAF Champions League, etc.) but never actually made an USL appearance are noted at the bottom of the page where appropriate.

This list does not include the NASL Whitecaps players unless they played in US Division 2 which the Vancouver 86ers began play in 1993, nor the MLS Whitecaps players.  This list also includes players in the USSF D2 Pro League for the year of 2010.  This list cannot be relied upon to include all players prior to 2003, nor Vancouver 86ers players who played in Canada's Division 1 Canadian Soccer League (1987-1992).

A "†" denotes players who only appeared in a single match.
A "*" denotes players who are known to have appeared for the team prior to 2003.

Roster

A
  Sola Abolaji
  Nicholas Addlery
  Mouloud Akloul
  Nelson Akwari
  Jay Alberts
  Said Ali
  Cody Arnoux
  Vicente Arze
  Geoff Aunger *

B
  Joel John Bailey
  Tyler Baldock
  Ivan Belfiore*
  Luca Bellisomo
  Nico Berg *
  Gary Brooks
  Tyrell Burgess
  Anthony Blondell

C
  Tony Caig
  Kevin Cameron
  Adrian Cann
  John Catliff *
  Rick Celebrini *
  Wesley Charles
  Gordon Chin
  Davide Chiumiento
  Chris Clarke
  Ian Clarke
  Jeff Clarke
  Carlo Corazzin
  La'Vere Corbin-Ong †
  Chris Craveiro
  Jason Craveiro
  Nico Craveiro
  Tino Cucca

D
  Paul Dailly
  Nick Dasovic
  Fuseini Dauda
  Philippe Davies
  William de Silva
  Srdjan Djekanovic
  Tony Donatelli
  Terry Dunfield

E
  Jim Easton Jr. *
  Randy Edwini-Bonsu
  Alex Elliott
  Ivor Evans *

F
  António Fonseca 
  Willis Forko 
  Chris Franks
  Michael Franks
  Steven Frazao
  Ian Fuller
  Douglas Muirhead

G
  Ethan Gage
  Charles Gbeke
  Nick Gilbert *
  Joey Gjertsen
  Richard Goddard
  Mark Gomes
  Andrew Gregor
  Winston Griffiths

H
  Marcus Haber
  Josh Hansen
  Kevin Harmse
  Ollie Heald
  Takashi Hirano
  Lars Hirschfeld *
  Kevin Holness *
  Eric Hassli

I
  Greg Ion*
  Justin Isidro

J
  Marlon James
  Greg Janicki
  Omar Jarun
  Martin Johnston
  John Jones
  Jason Jordan

K
  Diaz Kambere
  Nizar Khalfan
  Steve Kindel
  Tiarnan King
  Steve Klein
  Wes Knight
  Gershon Koffie

L
  Bob Lenarduzzi *
  Stefan Leslie
  Jamie Lowery *
  Shaun Lowther *
  Geordie Lyall

M
  Steve Macdonald*
  Alen Marcina
  Nigel Marples
  Alexander Marques-Delgado
  Lyle Martin
  Navid Mashinchi
  Sita-Taty Matondo
  Josue Mayard
  Jonathan McDonald
  Doug McKinty *
  Jason McLaughlin
  Dale Mitchell *
  Domenic Mobilio *
  Ridge Mobulu
  Jared Montz *
  Justin Moose
  Alexandre Morfaw
  David Morris
  Doug Muirhead *
  Scott Munson *

N
  Martin Nash
  Matthew Nelson
  Jay Nolly
  Anthony Noreiga
  David Norman *

O
  Norm Odinga *
  Giuliano Oliviero *
  Pat Onstad *
  Michael Onwatuegwu †
  Dever Orgill

P
  Jeff Parke
  Shaun Pejic
  Lutz Pfannenstiel
  Jeremie Piette
  Kyle Porter
  Simon Postma
  Chris Pozniak

R
  Marco Reda
  Mario Jorge Ramos-Aveleira
  Craig Robson

S
  Jake Sagare
  Admir Salihovic
  Randy Samuel*
  Ricardo Sánchez
  Eduardo Sebrango
  Alex Semenets
  Musa Shannon
  Jeff Skinner
  Graham Smith
  Jonny Steele
  Cornelius Stewart
  Ryan Suarez
  John Sulentic

T
  Narcisse Tchoumi-Tchandja
  Russell Teibert †
  David Testo
  Simon Thomas †
  Justin Thompson
  Niall Thompson *
  Guido Titotto*
  Rick Titus *
  Ansu Toure
  Doudou Touré
  Mason Trafford
  Ryan Trout
  Zourab Tsiskaridze

V
  Alfredo Valente
  Carl Valentine *
  Andrew Veer
  Kénold Versailles

W
  Blake Wagner
  Mark Watson
  Mason Webb
  Nick Webb
  Josh Wicks
  Chris Williams
  Corey Woolfolk

X
  Davide Xausa

Y
  Gregor Young*

Z
  Zé Roberto

See also
 List of Vancouver Whitecaps FC players—equivalent list for this team's Major League Soccer successor

Sources

Vancouver Whitecaps
 
Vancouver Whitecaps (1974–1984) players
Association football player non-biographical articles